Adam Rifkin (born December 31, 1966), sometimes credited as Rif Coogan, is an American filmmaker, and actor. His career ranges from broad family comedies to dark and gritty urban dramas. He is best known for writing family-friendly comedies like Mouse Hunt and 2007's Underdog. Most recently, Rifkin directed The Last Movie Star (2017).

Early life and education 
A native of Chicago, Illinois, Rifkin graduated from the Chicago Academy for the Arts in 1984, after which he moved to Los Angeles. He attended the University of Southern California for one year before dropping out. He then began writing scripts and collaborating with Brad Wyman.

Career 
As a screenwriter, Rifkin has written several family-friendly movies. He wrote Knucklehead for WWE Studios, starring WWE star Big Show, Underdog for Walt Disney Animation Studios, Zoom, starring Tim Allen and two films for DreamWorks, Mouse Hunt and Small Soldiers. Continuing in the family film genre, he wrote the big screen version of He-Man for John Woo and 20th Century Fox. He also wrote the unused draft of Planet of the Apes in 1988.

Rifkin's film The Dark Backward was named one of the top ten films of its year by The New York Post. He was then the director responsible for New Line Cinema's Detroit Rock City.

Directing 
Rifkin directed his first film Never on Tuesday in 1989. As of December 6, 2007, he has directed eleven others, including The Chase (1994), Detroit Rock City (1999) and the Night at the Golden Eagle (2002).

Production 
Rifkin began his production career in 1999 on the production of Touch Me in the Morning by Giuseppe Andrews. Preceding his completion of that project, Rifkin produced his own film Night at the Golden Eagle as well as Getting Hal by Tony Markes.

Acting 
Rifkin began his acting career in 1989 his directorial debut Never on Tuesday. Rifkin has appeared in small roles and cameos in his other films, Night at the Golden Eagle, Without Charlie, Detroit Rock City, The Dark Backward, Denial and Psycho Cop 2. Rifkin also appeared as Croaker/Miss Spain in the 1989 film, Going Overboard, starring Adam Sandler and Burt Young.

He also wrote, directed and acted in the 2007 film Homo Erectus, in which he portrays a wimpy caveman called Ishbo, the main character in the film. The film's ensemble cast includes Ali Larter, David Carradine, Talia Shire, Gary Busey, and Ron Jeremy.

Filmography

Film

Acting credits

Television

References

External links 

1966 births
American male actors
American film directors
American film producers
Living people
American male writers